Pany is a surname. Notable people with the surname include:

 Irma Pany (born 1988), Cameroonian singer-songwriter
 Rudra Narayan Pany (born 1959), Indian politician

See also
 a section of the village of Luzein in Switzerland